Lim Jae-beom (born January 6, 1994), better known as Jay B and formerly JB, is a South Korean singer and songwriter, best known as a member and leader of South Korean boy band Got7.

He got interested in musical composition when he was a b-boy, but started writing songs only after joining JYP Entertainment in 2009: he's first credited as a lyricist for the song "Bad Behaviour" from Got7's 2014 extended play Got Love. In 2016 he became more involved in composition and adopted the pseudonym Defsoul, which was shortened to Def. the following year.

Songs 
All song credits are adapted from the Korea Music Copyright Association's database, unless otherwise noted.

2012–2016

2017

2018

2019

2020

2021

2022

2023

References 

Jay B